Sinocyclocheilus cyphotergous is a species of ray-finned fish in the genus Sinocyclocheilus.

References 

cyphotergous
Fish described in 1988